Tocila River may refer to:
 Tocila, a tributary of the Lăpuș in Maramureș County, Romania
 Tocila Mare, a tributary of the Valea Tocilelor in Sibiu County, Romania
 Tocila Mică, a tributary of the Valea Tocilelor in Sibiu County, Romania

See also 
 Tocilița River, in Brașov County, Romania